Emile Morched Bustani  (Arabic: اميل مرشد البستاني) was a Lebanese entrepreneur, philanthropist and politician.

Early life and education
Bustani was born in 1907 in Dibbiyeh – Chouf. After he lost his father at age of six, Bustani was raised by American missionaries at the Gerard Institute in Sidon – South Lebanon. Later, Bustani received help from a wealthy Lebanese businessman to study engineering at the American University of Beirut, from where he received a BS in that field by 1929.

In 1930, he rejoined AUB as an instructor in Physics and as a Graduate student he received his MA in Astro-Physics by 1932. A year later in 1933, he obtained a BS in civil engineering from Massachusetts Institute of Technology, USA.

Career
Back in Beirut after MIT, Bustani worked for a time with the Iraq Petroleum Company, but soon founded his own Contracting and Trading Company, CAT – a company involved in laying and constructing oil pipelines, building roads and constructing cities throughout the Middle East.

Bustani was elected a Member of Parliament in Lebanon in 1951, an office he held until his death in 1963.

Death and legacy
Bustani died on March 15, 1963 (age 56) when his airplane crashed off the coast of Beirut in a heavy storm.

He is the father of Mirna Bustani, first woman to be elected in the Lebanese Parliament.

References 

1907 births
1963 deaths
Lebanese politicians
Lebanese philanthropists
Lebanese Maronites
20th-century philanthropists
Victims of aviation accidents or incidents in Lebanon
People from Chouf District